The Architectural Woodwork Institute (AWI), founded in 1953, is an American professional trade association. Member companies are the fabricators of fine finished woodwork, millwork, and furniture. AWI has published a Standard of Care for woodworking since 1961, called the Quality Standards Illustrated.

References
 8th Edition Quality Standards Illustrated (QSI) - Introduction - Potomac Falls, Virginia - 2003

External links

Woodworking
Trade associations based in the United States